International Channel Shanghai, better known as ICS, is the foreign-language cable channel of Shanghai Media Group. Long before the parent company was known as SMG, Shanghai Television Station began producing the English-language News at Ten in 1986. On January 1, 2008, ICS replaced the Shanghai Broadcasting MusicChannel as a 24-hour English service (with one weekly program in Japanese). In 2010, the channel replaced its "Red Sun Seagull" logo from the old Oriental TV channel with the STV "Magnolia" logo. The channel's news department produces a Monday-through-Saturday news program Shanghai Live at 9:00pm, and the weekly business/financial news program Money Talks on Saturday nights. On December 8, 2011, the Asian Television Awards named Shanghai Live "Best News Programme" of 2011.

Other locally produced programs include:
 Bridge to Japan 中日之橋
 Money Talks
 Cosmo Times
 City Beat
 You Are the Chef
 Getaway
 Culture Matters
 Voices
 Way to Wellness
 Minds of Millionaires

The channel also co-produced two seasons of The Amazing Race – China Rush, whose first season was "highly commended" at the 2011 Asian Television Awards.

References

External links
 International Channel Shanghai Official Website

Television stations in China
Shanghai Media Group
Television channels and stations established in 2008